Kingsland Bridge is a privately owned toll bridge, spanning the River Severn in Shrewsbury, Shropshire. It is located near Shrewsbury School and the cost for cars to cross is 20p. It is a Grade II listed building.

History
A bill promoting the toll bridge was first introduced to Parliament in 1873, and eventually passed in 1880. The bridge was promoted by Henry Robertson, who was also M.P. for Shrewsbury and designed by the civil engineer John William Grover. It was constructed in 1883 by the Cleveland Bridge & Engineering Company, which also built the Victoria Falls Bridge. The bridge spans 212 feet (64.6m) and comprises two metal arch ribs, from which the main bridge deck is hung. It cost £11,156 to build.

See also 
Crossings of the River Severn

References

Sources 

Blackwall, Anthony, Historic Bridges of Shropshire, Shropshire Libraries, 1985, 
Listed status at Borough council

Bridges across the River Severn
Bridges in Shrewsbury
Bridges completed in 1883
Toll bridges in England
Grade II listed bridges
Grade II listed buildings in Shropshire